The Singapore Jewellery Design Award is a competition among art school students, initiated by the Singapore Jewellery association (SJA). The SJDA provides an opportunity for the winning designs to be manufactured into jewellery pieces to be marketed and sold.

The contest is divided into three major categories. After a preliminary round, the top 30 designs proceed to the final round and compete for the winning position. Winning designs are showcased at the Singapore International Jewellery show.

In 2018, the award was held during the Singapore Jewellery and Gem Fair.

Winners
2017 - Growing With Singapore
 Category A: Heirloom (Past) - Marisa Chow, Nanyang Academy of Fine Arts (NAFA), Singapore
 Category B: Racial Harmony (Present) - Hans Daniel V. De Castro, University of the Philippines (Diliman), The Philippines
 Category C: Future of Us (Future) - Li Chih Tung, Taiwan Jewellery Arts Institute, Taiwan

References

External links
 SJDA official site
 Diamond Prices in Singapore
Design awards